Garphyttan is a locality situated in Örebro Municipality, Örebro County, Sweden with 1,619 inhabitants in 2010. It lies 16 km northwest of Örebro, near Garphyttan National Park.

Riksdag elections

References 

Populated places in Örebro Municipality